Chung Jae-hun (Hangul: 정재훈; born May 6, 1981 in Seoul, South Korea) is a former South Korean pitcher who plays for the Doosan Bears in the KBO League.

Education
Dankook University
Seoul Baemyung High School
Seoul Baemyung Middle School
Seoul Joongdae Elementary School

External links
Career statistics and player information from Korea Baseball Organization

1981 births
Living people
South Korean baseball players
Doosan Bears players
KBO League pitchers
Dankook University alumni